Presidential elections, legislative and local elections were held in the Philippines on May 11, 1998. In the presidential election, Vice President Joseph Estrada won a six-year term as president by a landslide victory. In the vice-presidential race, Senator Gloria Macapagal Arroyo won a six-year term as vice president also by a landslide victory. This was the third election where both president and vice president came from different parties.

Candidates

Lakas-NUCD-UMDP

Estrada-Angara

Results

President

Vice president

Senate

House of Representatives

The first party-list elections were held. Aside from voting for the representative from their congressional district, a voter can also vote for a party-list.

District elections

Party-list election

See also
Commission on Elections
Politics of the Philippines
Philippine elections
President of the Philippines
11th Congress of the Philippines

External links
 The Philippine Presidency Project
 Official website of the Commission on Elections
 Official website of the House of Representatives

1998
1998 elections in the Philippines